The Jad people are a community found in Himachal Pradesh and Uttarakhand.

They are also known as Lamba and Khampa.

Social status
, the Jad people were classified as a Scheduled Tribe under the Indian government's reservation program of positive discrimination.

References

Scheduled Tribes of Himachal Pradesh